The Stolpersteine in Prague-Nusle lists the Stolpersteine in the district Nusle of Prague. The district has been split off. Since 2002 it belongs mainly to Praha 4, but parts of it are now in Praha 2. Stolpersteine is the German name for stumbling blocks collocated all over Europe by German artist Gunter Demnig. They remember the fate of the Nazi victims being murdered, deported, exiled or driven to suicide.

Generally, the stumbling blocks are posed in front of the building where the victims had their last self chosen residence. The name of the Stolpersteine in Czech is: Kameny zmizelých, stones of the disappeared.

Nusle

Dates of collocations 
According to the website of Gunter Demnig the Stolpersteine of Prague were posed on 8 October 2008, 7 November 2009, 12 June 2010, 13 to 15 July 2011 and on 17 July 2013 by the artist himself. A further collocation occurred on 28 October 2012, but is not mentioned on Demnig's page.

The Czech Stolperstein project was initiated in 2008 by the Česká unie židovské mládeže (Czech Union of Jewish Youth) and was realized with the patronage of the Mayor of Prague.

See also 
 List of cities by country that have stolpersteine

External links

stolpersteine.eu, Demnig's website

References

Nusle